Creswell is an unincorporated community in Harford County, Maryland, United States. Fair Meadows was listed on the National Register of Historic Places in 1980.

References

Unincorporated communities in Harford County, Maryland
Unincorporated communities in Maryland